Yves Ed'duvill Edwards (born September 30, 1976) is a Bahamian retired mixed martial artist, who is best known for competing in the UFC's Lightweight division, fighting 21 times in the promotion. A professional competitor since 1997, he also competed for PRIDE, the WEC, Strikeforce, Bellator, EliteXC, King of the Cage, BodogFIGHT, the MFC, and HDNet Fights. For a period of time (2004), Edwards was ranked as the #1 Lightweight in the world.

Background
Edwards was born on the island of New Providence in the Bahamas and moved to Texas when he was 14 years old. Edwards began training in traditional karate in his youth, moving on to Kung Fu before eventually taking up mixed martial arts. This also led him to Muay Thai in order to improve his stand-up. Like many aspiring martial artists, Edwards cites Hong Kong cinema as a formative influence. He has been quoted as saying "I've always liked the old Hong Kong flicks, and I was a big comic book fan: you know the superheroes, they were always big in my mind. Anything that will make me physically better than the average person, and teach me to do things that the average person can't do, I was game for it."

Based in Houston since his teens, Edwards says he learned some grappling on a trip back home to the Bahamas at the age of 17, although "it wasn't as technical as it should have been, but it was better than not getting anything." He is a well-rounded fighter, with a strong boxing background, having also trained with Lewis Wood, a #6 WBA Featherweight boxer. This is in addition to his experience in Muay Thai and Brazilian jiu-jitsu, of which he says "I've never worn a gi 'cause I've always been competing".

Mixed martial arts career

Early career
Edwards made his professional mixed martial arts debut in 1997 and compiled a record of 18-5-1 before being signed by the UFC.

Ultimate Fighting Championship and World Extreme Cagefighting
Edwards made his UFC debut at UFC 33 against Matt Serra and was defeated via unanimous decision. He would then go 6–1 in his next seven appearances under the Zuffa banner.

At UFC 49, Edwards knocked out Josh Thomson by way of a spectacular flying head-kick. Due to the fact that the lightweight division had no current champion at the time, Edwards was regarded as "The Uncrowned Lightweight Champion of the UFC."

Post-UFC
After two wins in the EliteXC promotion, Edwards lost to EliteXC Lightweight Champion K. J. Noons via KO in the first round in June 2008, and lost a unanimous decision to Duane Ludwig at Strikeforce: Destruction.

He rebounded with a submission victory against James Warfield in September 2009, and next defeated Kyle Jensen by way of TKO in the first round. Yves followed up that victory the following February with an impressive quick TKO of fellow UFC veteran Derrick Noble.

Return to the UFC
Edwards returned to the UFC against John Gunderson on September 15, 2010 at UFC Fight Night 22, replacing Efrain Escudero who was promoted to the main card. Edwards won the fight via unanimous decision.

Edwards was expected to face Melvin Guillard on January 22, 2011, at UFC Fight Night 23, but Guillard was promoted to the main event against Evan Dunham after Kenny Florian was forced off the card with an injury. Edwards then faced replacement Cody McKenzie on the card, and won via rear naked choke in the second round earning Fight of the Night and Submission of the Night honors.

Edwards fought Sam Stout on June 11, 2011 at UFC 131 and was knocked out by an overhand left at 3:52 of the first round.

Edwards defeated Rafaello Oliveira via second-round TKO on October 1, 2011 at UFC on Versus 6.

Edwards faced Tony Ferguson on December 3, 2011 at The Ultimate Fighter 14 Finale. Edwards lost the fight via unanimous decision in a back and forth fight.

Edwards was expected to face Donald Cerrone at UFC on Fuel TV: The Korean Zombie vs. Poirier on May 15, 2012. However, Edwards was forced from the bout with an injury and replaced by Jeremy Stephens.

Edwards was expected to face Jeremy Stephens on October 5, 2012 at UFC on FX 5. However, the bout was cancelled due to Stephens being arrested on the day of the event for an assault charge that dated back to 2011. The fight eventually took place on December 8, 2012 at UFC on Fox 5. Edwards won by knockout in the first round, being the first fighter to ever stop Stephens via strikes.

Edwards faced promotional newcomer Isaac Vallie-Flagg on February 2, 2013 at UFC 156. He lost the fight via split decision.

Edwards was expected to face Spencer Fisher on July 27, 2013 at UFC on Fox 8. However, on July 11, Fisher was removed from the bout due to injury and replaced by Daron Cruickshank. He lost a split decision.

Edwards made his nineteenth UFC appearance when he took on Yancy Medeiros at UFC Fight For The Troops 3 on November 6, 2013. He lost the fight via knockout in the first round. The loss, however, was subsequently overturned to a no contest when Medeiros tested positive for marijuana.

Edwards was expected to face Piotr Hallmann at UFC 173 on May 24, 2014.  However, the bout was moved and took place on June 7, 2014 at UFC Fight Night 42 instead. Edwards lost the fight via rear-naked choke submission in the third round.

Edwards faced Akbarh Arreola on November 22, 2014 at UFC Fight Night 57. He lost the fight via armbar submission in the first round.

Retirement 
Following the loss, Edwards announced his official retirement from mixed martial arts, closing out his career after seventeen years. Edwards said on Facebook "Fighting has been a part of my life ever since I was 17 and that makes this a hard pill to swallow but it's time for me to end this chapter and move on to the next part of my life." Edwards is the only mixed martial arts fighter that competed for UFC, PRIDE, WEC, Strikeforce and Bellator.

Fighting style

Thugjitsu 
The term "Thugjitsu" first emerged with Edwards, its proclaimed founder. Edwards was seen by many as an unorthodox fighter. This was exemplified by Edwards' flying head kick KO of Josh Thomson at UFC 49. Edwards' fighting style earned him the title "Thugjitsu Master".

Edwards defined Thugjitsu as "The combination of every range of fighting and is the ultimate combat sport. Boxing, Thaiboxing, Wrestling and BJJ all play an equally important role in Thugjitsu; yet none of these arts is enough to be successful alone. A solid combination of two, three or more these and other arts help in the make-up of the complete fighter."

UFC Lightweight Dustin Poirier proclaimed himself to be a Thugjitsu practitioner in honor of Edwards.

Influences 
Edwards has stated that UFC Hall of Famer Bas Rutten is his idol. Bas Rutten watched Edwards' third pro-MMA fight in 1998 where Edwards defeated Tim Horton in the first round via TKO. Edwards was invited by Rutten to spend time with him in his car. "Bas is always an awesome guy," said Edwards, "He's cool as hell. One of the nicest guys in the game."

Personal life 
Edwards has a daughter named Destiny and a son named Yvan.

Filmography

Film and documentary

Television

Championships and accomplishments 
 Ultimate Fighting Championship
 Fight of the Night (Two time) vs. Joe Stevenson; Cody McKenzie  
 Knockout of the Night (One time) vs. Jeremy Stephens 
 Submission of the Night (One time) vs. Cody McKenzie 
HOOKnSHOOT
HnS Middleweight Championship (One time)

Mixed martial arts record 

|-
|  Loss
| align=center| 42–22–1 (1)
| Akbarh Arreola
| Submission (armbar)
| UFC Fight Night: Edgar vs. Swanson
| 
| align=center| 1
| align=center| 1:52
| Austin, Texas, United States
| 
|-
| Loss
| align=center| 42–21–1 (1)
| Piotr Hallmann
| Submission (rear-naked choke)
| UFC Fight Night: Henderson vs. Khabilov
| 
| align=center| 3
| align=center| 2:31
| Albuquerque, New Mexico, United States
| 
|-
| NC
| align=center| 42–20–1 (1)
| Yancy Medeiros
| No Contest (overturned)
| UFC: Fight for the Troops 3
| 
| align=center| 1
| align=center| 2:47
| Fort Campbell, Kentucky, United States
| 
|-
| Loss
| align=center| 42–20–1
| Daron Cruickshank
| Decision (split)
| UFC on Fox: Johnson vs. Moraga
| 
| align=center| 3
| align=center| 5:00
| Seattle, Washington, United States
| 
|-
| Loss
| align=center| 42–19–1
| Isaac Vallie-Flagg
| Decision (split)
| UFC 156
| 
| align=center| 3
| align=center| 5:00
| Las Vegas, Nevada, United States
| 
|-
| Win
| align=center| 42–18–1
| Jeremy Stephens
| KO (punches and elbows)
| UFC on Fox: Henderson vs. Diaz
| 
| align=center| 1
| align=center| 1:55
| Seattle, Washington, United States
| 
|-
| Loss
| align=center| 41–18–1
| Tony Ferguson
| Decision (unanimous)
| The Ultimate Fighter 14 Finale
| 
| align=center| 3
| align=center| 5:00
| Las Vegas, Nevada, United States
| 
|-
| Win
| align=center| 41–17–1
| Rafaello Oliveira
| TKO (head kick and punches)
| UFC Live: Cruz vs. Johnson
| 
| align=center| 2
| align=center| 2:44
| Washington, D.C., United States
| 
|-
| Loss
| align=center| 40–17–1
| Sam Stout
| KO (punch)
| UFC 131
| 
| align=center| 1
| align=center| 3:52
| Vancouver, British Columbia, Canada
| 
|-
| Win
| align=center| 40–16–1
| Cody McKenzie
| Submission (rear-naked choke)
| UFC: Fight for the Troops 2
| 
| align=center| 2
| align=center| 4:33
| Fort Hood, Texas, United States
| 
|-
| Win
| align=center| 39–16–1
| John Gunderson
| Decision (unanimous)
| UFC Fight Night: Marquardt vs. Palhares
| 
| align=center| 3
| align=center| 5:00
| Austin, Texas, United States
| 
|-
| Win
| align=center| 38–16–1
| Luis Palomino
| Decision (unanimous)
| Bellator 24
| 
| align=center| 3
| align=center| 5:00
| Hollywood, Florida, United States
| 
|-
| Loss
| align=center| 37–16–1
| Mike Campbell
| Decision (unanimous)
| Moosin: God of Martial Arts
| 
| align=center| 3
| align=center| 5:00
| Worcester, Massachusetts, United States
| 
|-
| Win
| align=center| 37–15–1
| Derrick Noble
| TKO (punches)
| MFC 24
| 
| align=center| 1
| align=center| 4:44
| Edmonton, Alberta, Canada
| 
|-
| Win
| align=center| 36–15–1
| Kyle Jensen
| TKO (punches)
| Raging Wolf 5
| 
| align=center| 1
| align=center| 2:44
| Niagara Falls, New York, United States
| 
|-
| Win
| align=center| 35–15–1
| James Warfield
| Submission (triangle choke)
| Shine Fights 2: American Top Team vs. The World
| 
| align=center| 2
| align=center| 4:48
| Miami, Florida, United States
| 
|-
| Loss
| align=center| 34–15–1
| Duane Ludwig
| Decision (unanimous)
| Strikeforce: Destruction
| 
| align=center| 3
| align=center| 5:00
| San Jose, California, United States
| 
|-
| Loss
| align=center| 34–14–1
| K. J. Noons
| TKO (punches and elbows)
| EliteXC: Return of the King
| 
| align=center| 1
| align=center| 0:48
| Honolulu, Hawaii, United States
| 
|-
| Win
| align=center| 34–13–1
| James Edson Berto
| KO (flying knee)
| EliteXC: Street Certified
| 
| align=center| 1
| align=center| 4:56
| Miami, Florida, United States
| 
|-
| Win
| align=center| 33–13–1
| Alonzo Martinez
| Submission (rear-naked choke)
| HDNet Fights: Reckless Abandon
| 
| align=center| 2
| align=center| 3:04
| Dallas, Texas, United States
| 
|-
| Win
| align=center| 32–13–1
| Nick Gonzalez
| Submission (rear-naked choke)
| EliteXC: Renegade
| 
| align=center| 1
| align=center| 3:05
| Corpus Christi, Texas, United States
| 
|-
| Loss
| align=center| 31–13–1
| Jorge Masvidal
| KO (head kick)
| BodogFIGHT: Alvarez vs. Lee
| 
| align=center| 2
| align=center| 2:19
| Trenton, New Jersey, United States
| 
|-
| Loss
| align=center| 31–12–1
| Mike Brown
| Decision (unanimous)
| BodogFIGHT: St Petersburg
| 
| align=center| 3
| align=center| 5:00
| St. Petersburg, Russia
| 
|-
| Loss
| align=center| 31–11–1
| Joe Stevenson
| TKO (doctor stoppage)
| UFC 61: Bitter Rivals
| 
| align=center| 2
| align=center| 5:00
| Las Vegas, Nevada, United States
| 
|-
| Win
| align=center| 31–10–1
| Seichi Ikemoto
| Decision (unanimous)
| Pride - Bushido 10
| 
| align=center| 2
| align=center| 5:00
| Tokyo, Japan
| 
|-
| Loss
| align=center| 
| Mark Hominick
| Submission (triangle armbar)
| UFC 58: USA vs. Canada
| 
| align=center| 2
| align=center| 1:52
| Las Vegas, Nevada, United States
| 
|-
| Loss
| align=center| 30–9–1
| Joachim Hansen
| Decision (split)
| PRIDE Bushido 9
| 
| align=center| 2
| align=center| 5:00
| Tokyo, Japan
| 
|-
| Win
| align=center| 30–8–1
| Dokonjonosuke Mishima
| Submission (armbar)
| PRIDE Bushido 7
| 
| align=center| 1
| align=center| 4:36
| Tokyo, Japan
| 
|-
| Win
| align=center| 29–8–1
| Hermes França
| Decision (split)
| Euphoria: USA vs. World
| 
| align=center| 3
| align=center| 5:00
| Atlantic City, New Jersey, United States
| 
|-
| Win
| align=center| 28–8–1
| Naoyuki Kotani
| TKO (head kick and punches)
| Euphoria: Road to the Titles
| 
| align=center| 1
| align=center| 3:10
| Atlantic City, New Jersey, United States
| 
|-
| Win
| align=center| 27–8–1
| Josh Thomson
| KO (flying head kick and punches)
| UFC 49
| 
| align=center| 1
| align=center| 4:32
| Las Vegas, Nevada, United States
| 
|-
| Win
| align=center| 26–8–1
| Hermes Franca
| Decision (split)
| UFC 47
| 
| align=center| 3
| align=center| 5:00
| Las Vegas, Nevada, United States
| 
|-
| Win
| align=center| 25–8–1
| Deshaun Johnson
| Decision (unanimous)
| WEC 9
| 
| align=center| 3
| align=center| 5:00
| Lemoore, California, United States
| 
|-
| Win
| align=center| 24–8–1
| Nick Agallar
| TKO (punches)
| UFC 45
| 
| align=center| 2
| align=center| 2:14
| Uncasville, Connecticut, United States
| 
|-
| Loss
| align=center| 23–8–1
| Tatsuya Kawajiri
| Decision (unanimous)
| Shooto - 8/10 in Yokohama Cultural Gymnasium
| 
| align=center| 3
| align=center| 5:00
| Yokohama, Japan
| 
|-
| Win
| align=center| 23–7–1
| Eddie Ruiz
| Decision (unanimous)
| UFC 43
| 
| align=center| 3
| align=center| 5:00
| Las Vegas, Nevada, United States
| 
|-
| Win
| align=center| 22–7–1
| Rich Clementi
| Submission (rear-naked choke)
| UFC 41
| 
| align=center| 3
| align=center| 4:07
| Atlantic City, New Jersey, United States
| 
|-
| Win
| align=center| 21–7–1
| Kohei Yasumi
| KO (punch)
| HOOKnSHOOT: New Wind
| 
| align=center| 1
| align=center| 1:20
| Evansville, Indiana, United States
| 
|-
| Win
| align=center| 20–7–1
| Joao Marcos Pierini
| TKO (injury)
| UFC 37.5
| 
| align=center| 1
| align=center| 1:19
| Las Vegas, Nevada, United States
| 
|-
| Loss
| align=center| 19–7–1
| Caol Uno
| Decision (unanimous)
| UFC 37
| 
| align=center| 3
| align=center| 5:00
| Bossier City, Louisiana, United States
| 
|-
| Win
| align=center| 19–6–1
| Kultar Gill
| Submission (heel hook)
| Shogun 1
| 
| align=center| 2
| align=center| 2:49
| Honolulu, Hawaii, United States
| 
|-
| Loss
| align=center| 18–6–1
| Matt Serra
| Decision (majority)
| UFC 33
| 
| align=center| 3
| align=center| 5:00
| Las Vegas, Nevada, United States
| 
|-
| Win
| align=center| 18–5–1
| Aaron Riley
| Decision (unanimous)
| HOOKnSHOOT: Showdown
| 
| align=center| 3
| align=center| 5:00
| Evansville, Indiana, United States
| 
|-
| Draw
| align=center| 17–5–1
| C.J. Fernandes
| Draw
| HOOKnSHOOT: Masters
| 
| align=center| 3
| align=center| 5:00
| Evansville, Indiana, United States
| 
|-
| Win
| align=center| 17–5
| Jeff Lindsay
| KO (kick)
| Renegades Extreme Fighting
| 
| align=center| 1
| align=center| 1:41
| Texas, United States
| 
|-
| Win
| align=center| 16–5
| Bone Sayavonga
| Submission (rear-naked choke)
| Renegades Extreme Fighting
| 
| align=center| 1
| align=center| 1:04
| Texas, United States
| 
|-
| Loss
| align=center| 15–5
| Jeremy Williams
| Decision (split)
| KOTC 7: Wet and Wild
| 
| align=center| 3
| align=center| 5:00
| San Jacinto, California, United States
| 
|-
| Win
| align=center| 15–4
| David Harris
| Submission (armbar)
| Bushido 1
| 
| align=center| 1
| align=center| 1:15
| Tempe, Arizona, United States
| 
|-
| Win
| align=center| 14–4
| Scott Bills
| TKO (punches)
| HOOKnSHOOT: Fusion
| 
| align=center| 1
| align=center| 4:31
| Evansville, Indiana, United States
| 
|-
| Win
| align=center| 13–4
| Danny Bennett
| Submission (rear-naked choke)
| KOTC 5: Cage Wars
| 
| align=center| 1
| align=center| 3:03
| San Jacinto, California, United States
| 
|-
| Win
| align=center| 12–4
| Pete Spratt
| Submission (triangle choke)
| Renegades Extreme Fighting
| 
| align=center| 1
| 
| Texas, United States
| 
|-
| Win
| align=center| 11–4
| Cedric Marks
| Submission (armbar)
| Extreme Shootout
| 
| align=center| 1
| align=center| 1:45
| Texas, United States
| 
|-
| Win
| align=center| 10–4
| Andy Mockler
| TKO (punches)
| HOOKnSHOOT: Meltdown
| 
| align=center| 2
| align=center| 1:32
| Evansville, Indiana, United States
| 
|-
| Loss
| align=center| 9–4
| Rumina Sato
| Submission (rear-naked choke)
| SuperBrawl 17
| 
| align=center| 1
| align=center| 0:18
| Honolulu, Hawaii, United States
| 
|-
| Win
| align=center| 9–3
| Stacy Coughlin
| TKO (punches)
| Armageddon 2
| 
| align=center| 1
| align=center| 2:00
| Houston, Texas, United States
| 
|-
| Win
| align=center| 8–3
| Aaron Riley
| Decision (unanimous)
| HOOKnSHOOT: Texas Heat
| 
| align=center| 1
| align=center| 20:00
| Texas, United States
| 
|-
| Win
| align=center| 7–3
| Shannon Ritch
| Submission (rear-naked choke)
| Armageddon 1
| 
| align=center| 1
| align=center| 2:39
| Houston, Texas, United States
| 
|-
| Loss
| align=center| 6–3
| Nate Marquardt
| Submission (heel hook)
| Bas Rutten Invitational 4
| 
| align=center| 1
| align=center| 3:04
| United States
| 
|-
| Win
| align=center| 6–2
| Anthony Holiday
| TKO (submission to knees)
| Extreme Shootout
| 
| align=center| 1
| align=center| 1:08
| McAllen, Texas, United States
| 
|-
| Win
| align=center| 5–2
| Thomas Denny
| Submission (verbal)
| West Coast NHB Championships 2
| 
| align=center| 1
| align=center| 3:09
| Los Angeles, California, United States
| 
|-
| Win
| align=center| 4–2
| Louie Cercedez
| TKO (doctor stoppage)
| West Coast NHB Championships 1
| 
| align=center| 1
| align=center| 3:38
| Los Angeles, California, United States
|  
|-
| Loss
| align=center| 3–2
| Fabiano Iha
| Submission (armbar)
| Extreme Challenge 22
| 
| align=center| 1
| align=center| 3:56
| West Valley City, Utah, United States
| 
|-
| Win
| align=center| 3–1
| Raphael Perlungher
| Submission (rear-naked choke)
| Power Ring Warriors
| 
| align=center| 1
| align=center| 3:25
| Humble, Texas, United States
| 
|-
| Win
| align=center| 2–1
| Tim Horton
| TKO (punches)
| World Shoot Wrestling
| 
| align=center| 1
| align=center| 9:15
| Pasadena, Texas, United States
| 
|-
| Loss
| align=center| 1–1
| Joe Hurley
| Decision (unanimous)
| World Pankration Championships 2
| 
| align=center| 1
| align=center| 15:00
| Dallas, Texas, United States
| 
|-
| Win
| align=center| 1–0
| Todd Justice
| Submission (rear-naked choke)
| World Pankration Championships 1
| 
| align=center| 1
| align=center| 5:46
| Texas, United States
|

References

External links
 
 Yves Edward's Official Site
 
 Revolution Dojo

1976 births
Living people
Bahamian male mixed martial artists
American male mixed martial artists
Bahamian practitioners of Brazilian jiu-jitsu
American practitioners of Brazilian jiu-jitsu
People awarded a black belt in Brazilian jiu-jitsu
Bahamian wushu practitioners
American wushu practitioners
Bahamian Muay Thai practitioners
American Muay Thai practitioners
Mixed martial artists from Texas
Lightweight mixed martial artists
Mixed martial artists utilizing wushu
Mixed martial artists utilizing Muay Thai
Mixed martial artists utilizing boxing
Mixed martial artists utilizing Brazilian jiu-jitsu
Sportspeople from Nassau, Bahamas
Bahamian emigrants to the United States
Ultimate Fighting Championship male fighters